Bříství is a municipality and village in Nymburk District in the Central Bohemian Region of the Czech Republic. It has about 400 inhabitants.

Geography
It lies in a flat landscape in the Central Elbe Table. The Kounický Brook flows through the municipality.

History
The first written mention of Bříství is from 1318. According to older research, the village was mentioned as early as 993 in connection with the founding of the Břevnov Monastery, but this theory is not substantiated.

Transport
The D11 motorway (part of the European route E67) from Prague to Hradec Králové passes through the municipality.

Sights
The landmark of Bříství is the Church of the Finding of the Holy Cross. It is a Gothic church with a Romanesque core, which was probably founded around 1150.

References

External links

Villages in Nymburk District